The Dice Man is a 1971 novel by American novelist George Cockcroft, writing under the pen name, "Luke Rhinehart". The book tells the story of a psychiatrist who makes daily decisions based on the casting of a diсe. Cockcroft describes the origin of the title idea variously in interviews, once recalling a college "quirk" he and friends used to decide "what they were going to do that night" based on a die-roll, or sometimes to decide between mildly mischievous pranks. The Hitchhiker's Guide to the Galaxy user site describes the novel as a book that was viewed as subversive, as having "anti-psychiatry sentiment", and as "reflecting the mood of the early 1970s in permissiveness". It has content that includes the protagonist's decisions to engage in rape and murder, and is described as having been "banned in several countries".

At the time of its publication, "[i]t was not clear whether the book was fiction or autobiography", all the more because the protagonist and the alleged author were eponymous; both were described as having the same profession (psychiatry), and elements of the described lives of both (e.g., places of residence, date of birth) were also in common; hence, curiosity over its authorship have persisted since its publication. Years later, in 1999, Emmanuel Carrère, writing for The Guardian, presented a long-form expose on Cockroft and the relationship between author and legend, disclosing him as a life-long English professor living "in an old farmhouse with a yard that slopes down to a duck pond", a husband of fifty-years, father of three, and a caregiver to a special-needs child.

On its initial publication, the cover bore the confident subheader, "Few novels can change your life. This one will"; in the United States this was altered to read, "This book will change your life". The book quickly became, and remains thought of as a cult classic. Writing in 2017 for The Guardian, Tanya Gold noted that "over the course of 45 years" it was still in print, had become famous, had devoted fans, and had "sold more than 2m copies in multiple languages". As well, it has been republished a number of times. It initially sold poorly in the United States, but well in Europe, particularly England, Sweden, Denmark, and Spain. Cockroft continued themes of the book in two other novels, Adventures of Wim (1986) and The Search for the Dice Man (1993), and in a companion title, The Book of the Die (2000), none of which achieved the commercial success of The Dice Man.

Plot summary
As stated at the Hitchhiker's Guide to the Galaxy user site:The book tells the story... of a psychologist named Luke [Rhinehart] who, feeling bored and unfulfilled in life, starts making decisions... based on a roll of a die. Along the way, there is sex, rape, murder, 'dice parties', breakouts by psychiatric patients, and various corporate and governmental machines being put into a spin. There is also a description of the cult that starts to develop around the man, and the psychological research he initiates, such as the 'F**k without Fear for Fun and Profit' programme.

Publishing history

  - September 9, 1971
  - July, 1978
  - April 13, 1989
  - July, 1998
  - December 15, 1999
  - April 7, 2003

In Pop Culture
British New Wave band Talk Talk wrote the song "Such A Shame" inspired by this novel.
British band The Fall based the song "Dice Man" on this novel.

See also
Yes Man (book)

References

External links
Extracts

1971 American novels
William Morrow and Company books
Novels about psychoanalysis
Dice
Novels set in New York City
1971 debut novels